Adamowski (feminine Adamowska) is a Polish surname. Notable people with the surname include:

 Ben Adamowski (1906-1982), American politician 
 Tadeusz Adamowski (1909-1994), Polish-American ice hockey player
 Timothee Adamowski (1858-1913), Polish-American conductor
 Helenka Adamowska-Pantaleoni (1900-1987), Polish-American humanitarian and founding director of U.S. Fund for UNICEF (sister of Tadeusz Adamowski and niece of Timothee Adamowski)

Polish-language surnames